Robert Kramer (June 22, 1939 – November 10, 1999), born in New York and educated at Swarthmore College and Stanford University, was an American film director, screenwriter and actor who directed 19 films between 1965 and 1999, most of them political cinema made from a left-wing point of view. His film À toute allure was entered into the 1982 Cannes Film Festival. He died of complications from meningitis.

Filmography

 FALN (1965)
 In the Country (1967)
 The Edge (1968)
 The People's War (1970)
 Ice (1970)
 Milestones (1975)
 Scenes from the Class Struggle in Portugal (1977)   
 Guns (1980)  
 À toute allure (Full speed, 1982)
 Notre nazi (Our Nazi, 1985)
 Diesel (1985)  
 Doc's Kingdom (1987) 
 X-Country (pronounced "cross-country") (1987) 
 Route One USA (1989) 
 Contre l'oubli (Against Oblivion, collective, 1991)
 Point de départ (Starting Place, 1994)
 Le manteau (The Coat, 1996)
 Walk the Walk (1996)
 The Ghosts of Electricity (1997)
 Cités de la plaine (Flat Land Cities, 2001)

See also
 Guerrilla filmmaking

References

External links
Robert Kramer (official webpage)

Bio and filmography at Harvard Film Archive.
The Guardian obituary.
New York Times obituary.

1939 births
1999 deaths
American male screenwriters
American male film actors
Neurological disease deaths in France
Infectious disease deaths in France
Deaths from meningitis
Film directors from New York City
Screenwriters from New York (state)
20th-century American male actors
20th-century American male writers
20th-century American screenwriters